Savoia was a 5,490 ton refrigerated cargo ship which was built in 1922. She was captured by the Royal Navy in 1941 and renamed Empire Arun. In 1947 she was sold and renamed Granlake. Further name changes were Dryad in 1949, Shiranesan Maru in 1951 and Dainichi Maru in 1962. She was scrapped in 1968.

History

Pre-war
Savoia was built by Stabilimento Tecnico, Trieste. She was yard number 736, launched on 25 May 1922 and completed on 1 December 1922. She was built for Navigazione Liberia Triestina (NLT), Trieste and served with them until 1937 when she was transferred to Lloyd Triestino, Trieste on the demise of NLT.

Wartime
She had been bound for Mombasa, Kenya. Savoia was taken as a war prize, renamed Empire Arun and passed to the Ministry of War Transport under the management of the Union-Castle Mail Steamship Co.

Empire Arun was a member of a number of convoys during the Second World War.

OS 17

Convoy OS 17 sailed from Liverpool on 18 January 1942 and arrived at Freetown, Sierra Leone on 7 February. Empire Arun was carrying general cargo and was bound for Freetown, St Helena, Cape Town and East London.

SL 141

Convoy SL 141 sailed from Freetown on 23 November 1943 and arrived at Liverpool on 17 December. Empire Arun was carrying a refrigerated and general cargo bound for Manchester.

SC 156

Convoy SC 156 sailed from Halifax, Nova Scotia on 29 March 1944 and arrived at Liverpool on 13 April. Empire Arun was carrying a general cargo bound for Liverpool

SC 162

Convoy SC 162 sailed from Halifax on 2 December 1944 and arrived at Liverpool on 17 December. Empire Arun was carrying a cargo of steel and general cargo bound for Manchester.

Postwar
In 1947, Empire Arun was sold to Ormos Shipping Co, London and renamed Granlake. She was sold to Goulandris Bros, London later that year. Granlake was sold to the Compagnia Maritime del Este, Panama in 1949 and renamed Dryad, operating under the management of Goulandris Bros (Hellas) Ltd. in 1951, Dryad was sold to Hikari Kisen KK, Tokyo and renamed Shiranesan Maru. She was sold to Mitsi Kinkai Kisen KK, Tokyo in 1953 and then to Hokuyo Suisan KK, Tokyo in 1955. At this point she was in use as a crab cannery. In 1962, she was sold to Nichiro Gyogyo KK, Tokyo, who renamed her Dainichi Maru and used her as a shellfish cannery. In 1969, Dainichi Maru was sold for scrap, arriving at Utsumi-Machi on 9 August 1969.

Official Number and code letters
Official Numbers were a forerunner to IMO Numbers.

Savoia had the Italian Official Number 625 until 1932 and the Italian Official Number 115 from 1933-42. Empire Arun had the UK Official Number 159353 from 1942-47.

Savoia used the Code Letters PGYH until 1933 and ICHB from 1934. Empire Arun used the Code Letters BCXG from 1942-47.

References

1922 ships
Ships built in Trieste
World War II merchant ships of Italy
Steamships of Italy
Empire ships
Ministry of War Transport ships
Steamships of the United Kingdom
Merchant ships of Panama
Steamships of Panama
Merchant ships of Japan
Steamships of Japan
Maritime incidents in February 1941